John Robert Taylor is British-born emeritus professor of physics at the University of Colorado, Boulder. 

He received his B.A. in mathematics at Cambridge University, and his Ph.D. from the University of California, Berkeley in 1963 with thesis advisor Geoffrey Chew. Taylor has written several college-level physics textbooks. His bestselling book is An Introduction to Error Analysis, which has been translated into nine languages. His intermediate-level undergraduate textbook, Classical Mechanics, was well-reviewed.

Awards
Taylor was designated a Presidential Teaching Scholar  in 1991. He has also received an Emmy Award for his television series Physics 4 Fun (1988–1990).

References

Year of birth missing (living people)
Living people
21st-century American physicists
American textbook writers
American male non-fiction writers
Science teachers
University of Colorado faculty
University of Colorado Boulder faculty
Alumni of the University of Cambridge
University of California, Berkeley alumni
American science writers
Emmy Award winners